Justin Trosper is an American musician, songwriter, and record producer, born in Olympia, Washington. He fronted the post-hardcore band Unwound from 1991 to 2002 and again from 2022 to present day. He has also been a member of bands such as Replikants, The Young Ginns, and Worst Case Scenario.  Most of his work has been released on the independent record label Kill Rock Stars.

Trosper has been a record producer for several Olympia-area bands, primarily at Unwound's self-built recording studio, MagRecOne. He has worked on albums by artists such as Thrones (Joe Preston), Young People, Shoplifting, Godzik Pink, Bangs, Long Hind Legs, Anna Oxygen, and The Magic Magicians.

In the early 1990s, he self-published a punk/indie rock fanzine, "Joe Preston's Legs AKA Germ of Youth". He is also a friend of Bikini Kill's Tobi Vail and a graduate of The Evergreen State College. In 2012, Trosper formed Survival Knife with former Unwound drummer Brandt Sandeno.

References

1972 births
Living people
American punk rock guitarists
American punk rock singers
Record producers from Washington (state)
Musicians from Olympia, Washington
Singers from Washington (state)
Guitarists from Washington (state)
Post-hardcore musicians
21st-century American singers
People from Tumwater, Washington
21st-century American guitarists